Andrew Johnson (1808–1875) was the president of the United States from 1865 to 1869.

Andrew Johnson or Andy Johnson may also refer to:

Art
Andy Dog Johnson (1959–2016), English artist and illustrator
Andy Johnson (artist) (1893–1971), Swedish-American painter

Politics
Andrew E. Johnson (born 1953), Florida State Representative, 1979–1982
Andrew Johnson (Michigan politician) (1889–?), member of the Michigan House of Representatives
Andrew Johnson (Minnesota politician) (born 1983 or 1984), Minneapolis City Councilmember
A. R. Johnson (1856–1933), Louisiana politician

Sports
Andrew Johnson (footballer, born 1981), English footballer for Birmingham City, Crystal Palace, Everton, Fulham, and QPR
Andrew Johnson (golfer) (born 1972), American professional golfer
Andrew Johnson (rugby league), rugby league footballer of the 1960s
Andrew Johnson (skier), American cross-country skier
Andy Johnson (American football) (1952–2018), American football player
Andy Johnson (basketball) (1932–2002), American basketball player
Andy Johnson (cricketer) (born 1964), former English cricketer
Andy Johnson (footballer, born 1974), Wales international footballer for Norwich City, Nottingham Forest, WBA, Leicester City, and Barnsley
Andy Johnson (rugby league) (born 1974), former London Broncos rugby league player

Other people
Andrew Johnson (soldier) (1833–1912), American Civil War Medal of Honor recipient
Andrew Johnson (architect) (1844–1921), American architect
Andrew Stuart Johnson (1848–1926), farmer, lumber merchant, mining company owner and political figure in Quebec
Andrew N. Johnson (1876–1959), Methodist minister
Andrew Johnson (actor) (born 1955), British-Asian actor

Other uses
USRC Andrew Johnson, various revenue cutters
Andy Johnson (Squirrel Boy)

See also
Drew Johnson (disambiguation)
Andrew Johnston (disambiguation)